Telugu Thalli Flyover (Asilmetta Flyover) is a flyover in the Indian city of Visakhapatnam. It was opened in the year 2013.

References 

Roads in Visakhapatnam
Bridges completed in 2013
Road interchanges in India
2013 establishments in Andhra Pradesh
Bridges in Andhra Pradesh
Buildings and structures in Visakhapatnam
Uttarandhra